Auschwitz II-Birkenau was a Nazi-German extermination camp, near Brzezinka, Poland, within the Auschwitz concentration camp complex during World War II.

Birkenau may also refer to:
 Birkenau (Odenwald), a municipality in the Odenwald in southern Hesse in Germany
 Brzezinka or Birkenau, a Polish village

See also
 Brzezinka (disambiguation)